Edward Charles Bennett (19 July 1876 – 19 January 1963) was a former Australian rules footballer who played with Carlton in the Victorian Football League (VFL).

Notes

External links 

Ned Bennett's profile at Blueseum

1876 births
Australian rules footballers from Ballarat
Carlton Football Club players
1963 deaths